Subinoy Roy (8 November 1921 – 9 January 2004) was an Indian singer, considered one of the best-known exponents of the songs of Rabindranath Tagore: (Rabindrasangeet).

Early life
Roy was initiated to Rabindra Sangeet by his mother at a very early age. Later, while studying chemistry in graduation level at Shantiniketan, he came in contact with Maestro Shailajaranjan Majumder and started learning Rabindra Sangeet from him. He learned Indian Classical Music from Ramesh Chandra Bandyopadhyay and Girija Shankar Chakrabarty.

Profession
At some time, he left Shantiniketan and pursued studying library science from England and joined Indian Statistical Institute as librarian. Still, he became renowned as a teacher of Rabindra Sangeet that too for being an authority in Rabindra Sangeet in its purest form. He became a regular artist of Rabindra Sangeet in the All India Radio since 1943. His first gramophone record was
released on 1949, with two songs; "তুমি ডাক দিয়েছ কোন সকালে" and "এই করেছো ভালো".
 
Though Subinoy was a puritan in rendition of Rabindra Sangeet, he was adaptable and open to liberalization. Once interviewed on expiry of copyright of the songs written by Rabindranath Tagore, Subinoy Roy expressed:

Death
Roy died in hospital in Kolkata four days after his wife.

Bibliography
Roy, Subinoy (1379 BS - 1972). রবীন্দ্র সংগীত সাধনা (Rabindra Sangeet Sadhana), A Mukherjee and Sons:Kolkata.

References

Rabindra Sangeet exponents
1921 births
2004 deaths
20th-century Indian male singers
20th-century Indian singers
Singers from Kolkata